The regulations governing Formula One racing have changed many times throughout the history of the sport.

Formula One's rules and regulations are set by the sport's governing body, the FIA. The primary reasons behind rule changes have traditionally been to do with safety. As each decade has passed the FIA have made more and more changes in the regulations so that better facilities and equipment are available in the event of an accident at race meetings. These rule changes have also been aimed at eliminating dangerous practices from the sport in an effort to make it safer.

Many innovations and technological improvements have been banned over the years as a result of FIA regulation changes. The governing body have taken these actions to slow the cars down to a level where a Grand Prix car can be driven relatively safely. Without this pruning of the sport's technological advancement cars today could be capable of cornering speeds in excess of 300 km/h. An accident whilst negotiating a corner at this speed would almost certainly result in the death of the driver.

Since 2000, the FIA has been issuing an increasing number of rule changes to limit the cost of the sport. The cost of running a team in the sport has increased dramatically in recent years and this situation has not proved sustainable. From 2009 onwards, Formula One has committed itself to dramatic reductions in expenditure.

1950s 

Although Formula One races had been taking place since 1948, it was not until 1950 that the World Championship was established. Safety was almost a non-issue in the first 10 years of racing and technological progress was extremely slow compared to modern standards. All of the circuits that Formula One raced on in the 1950s had no safety features; the general mentality was that death was an acceptable risk for winning races, and as a result very few regulations were changed during this period.

 1950–1953  Engine specs set at 1500 cc maximum size for engines with a compressor (supercharger or turbocharger) or 4500 cc for naturally aspirated engines. No weight limit. Note that in 1952 and 1953, the World Drivers' Championship was run to Formula Two regulations (maximum capacity of 750 cc for engines with a compressor or 2000 cc for naturally aspirated engines), but the Formula One regulations remained unchanged, and numerous non-championship Formula One races were held during this period. Also for 1952, crash helmets were made compulsory; but these helmets were made with dubious materials and looked like medium-sized dinner bowls.
 1954  Engine specs amended to allow 750 cc maximum engine size with a compressor or 2500 cc for a naturally aspirated engine. No weight limit.
 1958  The use of commercial petrol became compulsory and alcohol-based racing fuels were banned.

1960s 

The 1960s began the way the previous decade had ended for Formula One's rule book with relatively few changes made. However, with the advent of a new breed of innovative and forward thinking designers like Colin Chapman and the beginnings of drivers lobbying for safer racing conditions, the number of rule changes made began to accelerate as the decade came to a close.

 1960  Regulations unchanged from 1959 (maximum engine capacity of 750 cc for a compressed engine or 2500 cc for naturally aspirated engines. No weight restrictions).
 1961–1965  Engine specs amended to a naturally aspirated engine of between 1300 cc and 1500 cc, no compressors allowed, minimum weight set at 450 kg, open wheels mandated, pump fuel only, automatic starter, roll bar required, double braking system mandatory, standardised seatbelt anchorage, fire protection for fuel tanks, fillers and breathers, FIA begin to organise safety inspections (previously done by local authorities), protective helmet and overalls obligatory, flag signalling code established.
 1966–1969  Engine specs amended to a 1500 cc engine with a compressor or a 3000 cc naturally aspirated engine allowed, minimum weight set at 500 kg, electrical circuit breaker, reverse gear, oil catch tank, a rollbar 5 cm above driver's head, two-part extinguisher system and cockpit designed for quick evacuation all made mandatory, all aerodynamic features must be immobile (thereby banning air brakes) and fixed to a sprung part of the car, maximum bodywork height and width restrictions ban the use of dangerous high wings, recommendations made on seat harnesses, fire-resistant clothing and shatterproof visors. Straw bales were banned from being used as safety barriers in response to Lorenzo Bandini's fatal accident in Monaco in 1967.

1970s 

The speed of Formula One cars had increased dramatically since 1950 but the standard of safety at race meetings had not followed suit. Deaths were still common, and there were many factors at play to blame. Many of the drivers felt that the danger level involved in the sport was unnecessarily high despite the changes in the rules that had been implemented by the end of the 1960s. The drivers' crusade for improved safety was led in the 1970s by Jackie Stewart. After the needless and avoidable death of Ronnie Peterson at the Italian Grand Prix in 1978, the sport finally made the wholesale changes needed to bring it up towards the modern standards of safety which it enjoys today. The 1970s was the last decade that Formula One raced at truly long circuits (i.e. with lap times close to or over 3 minutes); and going into the decade, Formula One still raced at the 5-mile Charade circuit, the 8.7-mile Spa-Francorchamps circuit and the 14.2-mile Nürburgring Nordschleife. Although all of the aforementioned circuits were improved with safety features, by 1977 Charade, Spa and the Nürburgring were all no longer on the calendar all for the same general reason- safety concerns. Safer circuits such as Paul Ricard, Zolder and Hockenheimring were built with safety features installed; and at the end of the decade Formula One had become a safer sport, although it was still dangerous. Ground effect, a technology that was able to create huge amounts of downforce with inverted aerofoils mounted on the sides of the car, was discovered and developed by Colin Chapman and his Lotus team in the mid 70s, and the technology was perfected with the dominant Type 79. All the other teams followed suit, and the performance of the cars skyrocketed over a period of 2 years.

 1970  Minimum weight set at 530 kg, safety bladder fuel cell tanks introduced, report published on track standards, recommended straw bales be banned, double guard rails in place, 3-metre grass verges, spectators to be kept a minimum of 3 metres behind guard railings, barrier between pit lane and track as well as track width, surface and gradient recommendations and mandatory FIA inspections of track facilities.
 1971  Role responsibilities and mandatory equipment list set out for race supervisors, marshals, and signalers. Drivers must be evacuated from cockpit in less than five seconds. All race distances must be under 200 miles (320 km).
 1972  Minimum weight increased to 550 kg, safety foam in fuel tanks, no magnesium sheeting to be less than 3 mm thick, 15w red rear light mandatory, head rest required, minimum cockpit dimensions, combined electrical cut off and extinguisher external handle required, fuel tanks to meet FIA specifications, six-point harness required, circuit safety criteria set down, driver's code of conduct released.
 1973  Numbers now assigned to drivers. The #1 number is assigned to the reigning World Champion. Minimum weight increased to 575 kg, crushable structure around fuel tanks mandatory, no chrome plating of suspension parts allowed (to avoid hydrogen embrittlement), drivers required to carry medical card and submit to medical examination before they are able to race, catch fencing and rescue equipment mandatory at races, starting grid dimensions standardised, fire service regulations established.
 1974  Self-sealing fuel lines mandatory, sand traps added to catch fencing as safety features at circuits, 2x2 staggered starting grid with 12 metres allowed per car.
 1975  Marshal's posts to be provided with service roads for ease of access, FIA standard set for fire resistant clothing.
 1976  Airboxes on the top of cars are banned, and the cooling of engines through similar means is heavily limited. "Safety structures" around dashboard and pedals implemented. After Niki Lauda's near-fatal accident at a nearly inaccessible point at the treacherous 14.2 mi (22.8 km) Nürburgring in West Germany, the circuit was taken off the 1977 calendar after having been on the calendar for all but 4 seasons of Formula One up to 1976.
 1977  Pedal box safety structures more adequately defined, gravel traps defined more adequately, helmets must be made to FIA approved standards.
 1978  Brabham's BT46B 'fan car' deemed illegal and banned after its first (and only) appearance of the season where it won at the Swedish Grand Prix, bulkhead behind driver and front roll bar defined, licence qualification criteria set for all drivers, all grid slots allocated 14 metres per car. Following a request from Lotus, a single centrally mounted fuel tank between the driver and engine is permitted. Previously, no more than 80 litres of fuel in a single tank is allowed, meaning most cars required 3 separate fuel tanks, usually 2 bag tanks either side of the driver's cockpit and another fuel tank behind him. However, this requires multiply fuel lines for the various tanks, and it is the shearing of the fuel lines in impacts that causes the fires of Jo Siffert, Roger Williamson and Niki Lauda. Therefore, the central single fuel tank pioneered by Lotus becomes accepted as a safer option to stop fuel lines from side impacts being sheared and igniting.
 1979  Medical air required to be piped into drivers helmet in the event of an accident, bigger cockpit opening, two mirrors and better fire extinguisher on board cars required, FIA appointed, professional, permanent race starter mandatory.

1980s 

With the raft of safety improvements as a result of Peterson's fatal crash being implemented during the late 70s and early 80s Formula One overall became much safer despite the deaths of Patrick Depailler in 1980 and Gilles Villeneuve & Riccardo Paletti in 1982. The huge amounts of downforce created by ground effect became increasingly dangerous as years went on, and aside from the fatal accidents mentioned above, a number of drivers crashed heavily enough for their careers to be brought to an end, and the technology was banned outright at the start of the 1983 season. These safety changes coupled with the much stronger carbon fibre replacing aluminium as the material of choice for chassis construction meant there was not a single driver fatality at a race meeting for the rest of the decade. However one factor threatening to undo all this progress was the almost exponential power increases being extracted from turbocharged engines. Renault proved in 1980 that turbocharging was the way to go to success, with their very dominant performances in qualifying in almost every race, especially on fast and high-altitude circuits, where the thinner air did not affect the turbocharged engines. With power output doubling in less than 10 years and figures in excess of  talked about by engine manufacturers, from 1986 onwards the FIA's primary goal was to rein in the turbo engines before finally banning them altogether at the end of the 1988 season. Brabham team owner Bernie Ecclestone and ex-March team owner Max Mosley set new organizational standards for Formula One, something they had been working on since 1972. All the races are now more organized by Formula One Management instead of circuit organizers doing their own things; such as setting specific times for when races, practice sessions and qualifying sessions are to start, and teams must commit to all of however many races are in a season, in order to assure sponsors that their advertising will be seen by television cameras, which was also an enterprise set up by Ecclestone and Mosley. This effectively transformed the sport into the multibillion-dollar business it is today.

 1980  Permanent medical facility required at all tracks, these facilities must be staffed by FIA approved medics, fast response car mandatory at all races, minimum weight for F1 car set at 575 kg.
 1981  The new Formula One World Championship is officially established by Formula One Management, an organization headed by Britons Bernie Ecclestone and Max Mosley. Through the teams' and the FIA's signing of the 1st Concorde Agreement concocted by Ecclestone and Mosley, they officially set newly organized standards, such as no more sequences of races being run over a period of seven months, and practice and qualifying sessions and the races being started at official times. The series is now an official business operating by its own operational standards while adhering to regulations set by the FIA; all of the circuit organizers must comply to these standards and regulations. This includes private entries of other makes of car disallowed. Any team entering any official championship Formula One race must enter their own cars and all teams have to commit to the number of races scheduled each season. Although the teams have to make their own cars, they are still allowed to purchase engines and gearboxes from independent manufacturers. Flexible side skirts banned to reduce downforce created by ground effect, mandatory ground clearance of 6 cm required to limit ground effect further, Lotus twin chassis type 88 outlawed, pit lane minimum width set at 10 metres, survival cell extending to the front of the driver's feet introduced to improve driver survivability in the event of an accident, minimum weight of car set at 585 kg.
 1982  Rotary engines, diesel engines, gas turbine engines and sarich orbital engines all banned as part of the Concorde Agreement, rigid skirts legalised and ride height restrictions removed as FIA admit that policing a ban is not possible whilst many teams are using hydraulic suspension systems to alter ride heights and circumvent the rules, minimum weight of car set at 580 kg.
 1983  Ground effect outlawed completely for the beginning of the 1983 season. all cars return to a flat undertray, four wheel drive banned along with cars with more than four wheels, minimum weight set at 540 kg.
 1984  In race refuelling outlawed, fuel tank required to be in centre of car, between driver and engine, maximum fuel capacity allowed on cars set at 220 litres per race to try and reduce the output of turbo engines, drivers required to have FIA super licence before they can compete in F1, concrete retaining walls permitted alongside guard rails.
 1985  Rear-wing size limits set in place. All cars now subject to a frontal crash test to be deemed race worthy.
 1986  Catch-fencing banned, permanent FIA medical service inspector and medevac helicopter mandatory at race meetings, after needless death of Elio de Angelis in testing. All F1 test sessions to be completed under full race meeting safety conditions, engine capacity 1500 cc with compressor (i.e. naturally aspirated engines prohibited), maximum fuel consumption reduced to 195 litres per race.
 1987  Boost pressure capped at 4.0 bars to limit turbo power, minimum weight of cars set at 500 kg. Naturally aspirated engines are permitted again, with a maximum capacity of 3500 cc and no fuel limit. Grid slots allocated 16 metres per car. FIA announce that from 1989 onwards turbos will be banned and to encourage teams to switch, two additional championships are introduced, which are open to non-turbo teams only: the Jim Clark Cup for drivers, and the Colin Chapman Trophy for constructors. These one-off championships are won by Jonathan Palmer and by Tyrrell-Ford respectively.
 1988  Boost pressure further reduced to a maximum of 2.5 bars to limit the power output of the turbo engines in their final year (until 2014), maximum fuel consumption of turbo cars reduced to 150 litres per race. In any design the driver's feet must not extend beyond the front wheel axle, static crash test of survival cell and fuel cell mandatory, minimum weight of cars increased to 540 kg.
 1989  Turbocharged engines banned completely, naturally aspirated engines of 3500 cc in size and 8 to 12 cylinders the only engines permitted, overhead air intakes allowed again, fuel restrictions removed, all track side guard rails must be a minimum of 1 metre in height and the pit wall must be a minimum of 1 m 35 cm in height, all drivers subject to anti doping testing as per IOC guidelines.

1990s 

Despite several near misses (particularly during the turbo era) Formula One had managed to go almost 12 whole years without a single fatality at a race meeting. The strength of the carbon fibre chassis being used and the fortunate escapes of many drivers involved in high speed accidents during this period made many people inside the sport believe that death was a thing of the past in Formula One. This attitude was made to look foolish when the FIA hastily banned virtually all of the performance enhancing electronic technology that the teams had become dependent on for the start of the 1994 season. This made many of that year's cars nervy and edgy to drive. With more horsepower than 1993 but with less in car stability some observers at the time (most notably Ayrton Senna) stated that they believed 1994 would "be a season with lots of accidents".

Near-fatal accidents of JJ Lehto and Jean Alesi during pre-season and in season testing were both to prove Senna right. This was climaxed by the catastrophic 1994 San Marino Grand Prix, with Brazilian Rubens Barrichello being severely injured during a heavy crash in a Friday practice session. This set the stage for the disastrous events of the rest of the weekend, which led to the deaths of Austrian driver Roland Ratzenberger and Senna himself; all three accidents on consecutive days. The sweeping changes that the FIA implemented post-Imola proved to be almost as rash as the ones at the end of 1993 and nearly claimed the life of Pedro Lamy in a testing accident. The cause of the accident was put down as rear wing failure as a result of the FIA rushing through new rules including one reducing the size of the rear diffuser which reduced the number of anchoring points the attached rear wing assembly could use.
To its credit the FIA learned from the mistakes of 1994 and much more consideration and forward thinking was put into changes made to the rules from there onwards. By the close of the decade a measure of the impact on the sport that the 1994 San Marino Grand Prix has had was that for the first time in its history, safety had become Formula One's number one concern.

 1990  Large mirrors and quick release steering wheel made mandatory, all marshals and medical staff must practice driver extrication exercises.
More stringent testing of survival cell by FIA including seat belts, fuel tanks and rollbar. Points scoring system overhauled, win now secures 10 points and all results to count instead of best 11 scores.
Continuously variable transmission (CVT) banned before ever appearing at a race. End of race crowd control measures implemented, 50 km/h speed lane restriction during free practice. Fuel used restricted to that available to the general public. Drivers limited to 12 laps each in both qualifying sessions; maximum number of cars on the grid set at 25 cars (later increased to 26 from German Grand Prix onwards)
After Imola, pit lane speed limit is implemented.
 1996  Increased cockpit protection around the driver's head. Front wing end plates to be no more than 10 mm thick to reduce damage to tyres of another car in the event of collision, all harness release levers must point downwards, to qualify for a race all cars must now be within 107% of pole time, car numbers now allocated on the basis of previous seasons performance, Friday qualifying abandoned but number of free practice sessions increased from two to three and number of laps allocated each day increased from 23 to 30, standardisation of all FIA safety cars and medical cars, more fire drills for marshals, starting procedure improved, data storage unit to be mounted within survival cell.
 1997  Test tracks now require FIA approval and supervision, kerbing standardised, bolted tyre wall construction obligatory, cars to carry FIA ADR (accident data recorder) to analyse success of implemented safety measures, FIA approval required for all chief medical officers and medical centres, safety car made more powerful and may now be used for wet weather starts, accident intervention plan revised.
 1998  Narrow track era begins in Formula One, width of car reduced from 2 metres to 1.8 metres with teams now running rubber with 14 mm grooves in, 4 on the rear and 3 on the front, to reduce the speed of the cars, asymmetric braking banned, X-wings banned mid-season, single fuel bladder mandatory, refuelling connector must be covered, cockpit dimensions increased, side impact test now to use 100% more energy, tyre barrier effectiveness increased, pit lane must now have 100 m of straight running before first pit garage, increased use of pit lane lights alongside flags.
 1999  Number of grooves on front tyres increased from three to four, flexible wings banned, pit lane shielding standardised, some run off areas to have asphalt instead of sand traps, at least four medical intervention cars and an FIA doctor car required, ADR required to be in operation during testing, wheels must be tethered to car to reduce the risk of launched components during an accident, rear and lateral headrest assembly made one piece and quick release, engine oil breathers must vent into engine air intake, extractable driver's seat mandatory, frontal impact test speed increased to 13 m/s.

2000s 

By the end of the 1990s safety standards had risen dramatically for the second time in 20 years. The deaths of marshals in both 2000 and 2001 after being struck by wheels after accidents at the Italian and Australian Grand Prix respectively showed that the sport will never be completely safe. However, on the whole, the sport was in much better shape safety-wise than it had been before. Save for the introduction of HANS (head and neck support) system in 2003 there have been no major safety improvements in the sport since the turn of the millennium, until the introduction of the halo in 2018.

Most of the changes that the FIA have implemented to the regulations in the nine seasons since the year 2000 have been aimed at trimming speed off the cars and, later in the decade, at reducing the costs involved in Formula One. These have risen by a factor of between three and four for the top teams like Ferrari and McLaren. This sudden increase in budgets has largely been down to the influx of big-spending car manufacturers setting up teams in the sport since Mercedes paved the way by buying 40% of the McLaren team.

By 2008, with the global credit crunch turning into a full-blown global recession, many of the car manufacturers (whose sales have been hit hard by the economic crisis) can no longer afford the huge amounts of money they are investing in the sport. The gravity of the situation was realised when Honda suddenly withdrew its participation at the end of the 2008 season, later confirming to have sold the team, specifically blaming the world economic crisis. With Toyota and BMW also withdrawing from the sport at the end of the following year, the remaining manufacturers along with the FIA agreed changes to the rules over the next seasons to bring about dramatic cost savings in an effort to save the sport from collapsing under the weight of its own costs.

 2000  Engines mandated to be V10 displacing no more than 3000cc, red flag procedure changed where races stopped after two laps but before three-quarters race distance had been completed would be restarted with the cars lining up on the grid in the order they were at the end of the penultimate lap before the lap during which the red flag was shown (only the race order and number of laps completed were taken into account for the new race, time differences between the cars were voided; the distance of the new race was the number of laps remaining from the original races, minus three laps); use of cooled fuel banned mid-season.
 2001  Traction control allowed again from the Spanish Grand Prix, as the FIA admit they are unable to police whether teams are using the system effectively to gain a competitive advantage, use of beryllium alloys in chassis or engine construction banned. Fully-automatic transmissions and launch control are also allowed again from the 2001 Spanish Grand Prix. Larger cockpit entry template and survival cell. Rear wings must have no more than 3 elements.
 2002  Team orders banned mid-season after Rubens Barrichello hands victory to Michael Schumacher at final corner of the Austrian Grand Prix.
 2003  Bi-directional telemetry banned HANS (Head And Neck Support) system mandatory, change to point scoring system, points now being awarded down to 8th place, actual points scored now to run 10, 8, 6, 5, 4, 3, 2, 1 from 1st to 8th place, testing allowed on a Friday of a race meeting in exchange for a reduction of testing mileage allowed outside of the Grand Prix calendar to make it more affordable for smaller teams, changes to qualifying session with only one flying lap now allowed for grid position with the 107% rule no longer applied, cars may not be refuelled between final qualifying and the race start.
 2004  Engines required to last a whole race meeting, any engine change to result in 10 place grid penalty, minimum weight set at 605 kg during qualifying and at no less than 600 kg at all other times (including driver and fuel), pit lane speed limited to 100 km/h at all times, each driver must select his wet and dry weather tyre compounds before the start of the race, the minimum size of the engine cover and rear wing endplates increased to maximise advertising space, multi-element rear wings banned and two-element wings mandated, launch control banned again for the second time, along with fully-automatic transmissions.
 2005  Rear diffuser size reduced to limit downforce, all engines now required to last two race weekends, qualifying format changed to two aggregate times from Saturday afternoon and Sunday morning to count towards grid positions (this format lasted until the European GP when qualifying reverted to a driver's fastest single lap to count from Saturday afternoon qualifying), further changes to dimensions of front and rear wings and nose of car to make overtaking easier, restriction on tyre changes during qualifying and the race itself, if a driver stalls on the grid after the parade lap the other cars will now complete a second lap whilst the stalled vehicle is removed, in the event of a red flag the two-hour race clock will no longer freeze between race sessions.
 2006  Only 14 sets of tyres allowed all weekend (seven dry, four wets and three extreme wets), in race tyre changing permitted again, qualifying format changed to three 15-minute shoot outs where the slowest cars are eliminated in the first two sessions leaving the 10 quickest to start with a clean slate and to go for pole position, the final session was reduced from 20 to 15 minutes from the French Grand Prix onwards, Saturday free practice increased from 45 minutes to an hour in length. Engine capacity was limited to 2400 cc and a V8 engine was introduced in an attempt to reduce horsepower (although teams were allowed to run a rev restricted V10 for an interim period if no engine under the new regulations was available to them), restriction in the use of non-ferrous materials in engine construction along with limiting the number of valves per cylinder to four, all engines must be of a 'V' configuration and at an angle of 90 degrees,
 2007  Tuned mass damper system banned, rev-limit of 19,000 rpm introduced, rear wing structure strengthened to prevent flexing, increased strength required from rear crash structure, single tyre supplier (Bridgestone) after withdrawal of Michelin, revised tyre regulations mean drivers must use both hard and soft compound tyre during the course of race (soft compound tyres are identified by a white stripe in one of the front tyre grooves), engine development frozen until the end of 2008 to cut costs, further restrictions to regulations means no teams may run a 3rd car on Friday, both sessions on Friday extended to 90 minutes in length, engine changes on first day of practice no longer subject to grid place penalty, pit lane restrictions during any period the safety car is on the track, annual testing limited to 30,000 km to reduce costs.
 2008  Traction control banned for the second and final time by means of all teams using a standard electronic control unit (ECU) to eliminate the possibility of teams concealing the technology within their own engine management systems, strict limits placed on the amount of CFD and wind tunnel testing allowed each year.
 2009  Banning of almost all aerodynamic devices other than front and rear wing, slick tyres allowed once more (keeping to narrow track dimensions), the limit of eight race/qualifying engines for the whole season (every new engine above this eight results in 10-place grid penalty), rev-limit decreased to 18,000 rpm, reduction of rear wing width from 1000 mm to 750 mm and an increase in height from 800 mm to 950 mm, reduction in the ground clearance of front wing from 150 mm to 50 mm and an increase in width from 1400 mm to 1800 mm, rear diffuser to be longer and higher, variable front aerodynamic devices permitted (with limited in-car control by the driver) and the introduction of KERS (kinetic energy recovery system) to store some of the energy generated under braking and convert it into a temporary horsepower increase of around 80 bhp that can be used 6.6 seconds per lap by the drivers for overtaking. Pit lane is no longer closed when safety car is deployed.

2010s 

Previous regulation changes at the tail end of the first decade of the new millennium aimed at improving the show had largely proven to be a failure. With cost escalation now largely under control thanks to recently implemented budget caps and safety standards at an all-time high, the sport's focus for the new decade is around continuing to improve the race spectacle. Alongside this however is the medium term objective of making the sport more environmentally aware, both in an effort to secure its future in times of dwindling fossil fuel reserves, but also to bring in new sponsors put off by the sport's image of conspicuous consumption.

 2010  Drastic cost-cutting measures are introduced. In-race refuelling ban returns, as a result fuel can be added to any F1 car after qualifying, but Q3 drivers must start the race with the tyres they set their fastest Q2 time with. Scoring system changed to allow the first ten cars to receive points: 25, 18, 15, 12, 10, 8, 6, 4, 2, 1. Backmarkers no longer able to unlap themselves behind the Safety Car. Teams unanimously agree not to use KERS for the 2010 season in order to allow all teams time to be able to develop and perfect their own systems.

 2011  The double-diffuser concept is banned, with teams requiring the use of simple, single-piece diffusers. The "F-duct" system pioneered by McLaren is banned (in conjunction with banning shark fins from being connected to the rear wing). Adjustable front wings have also been banned. Gearboxes must last for 5 race weekends, but for the season each driver has one penalty free (a.k.a. a "joker") gearbox change at their disposal. Driver adjustable rear wing, known as DRS (drag reduction system) introduced to help overtaking. Can be freely used in practice and qualifying, but in the race only when within 1 second of the next car by the detection zone, and only activated in the activation zone. DRS wing must immediately close under braking, and DRS is de-activated in the first 2 laps of each race, plus when a track is declared wet. 107% qualifying rule re-introduced following concerns about new teams pace. Teams agree to re-introduce KERS, with minimum car weight increasing by twenty kilograms to offset the weight of the KERS device. Sporting regulations amended to clear up last-lap safety car and qualifying in-lap procedures. Drivers are also warned to be examples of road safety when driving in public following Lewis Hamilton being pulled over following the 2010 Australian Grand Prix; FIA President Jean Todt suggests a policy similar to the NFL Personal Conduct code for suspension or revocation of racing licences. Ban on team orders lifted (although FIA can use disrepute clause for misuse of it).

 2012  Exhaust tailpipes raised after dispute regarding off-blown diffusers at the 2011 British Grand Prix, car noses reprofiled. Reactive ride systems, "exotic" engine maps, and use of heliums on air guns (to change tyres) banned. Cars must be cleared from all crash tests before pre-season testing. Races capped to four hours (including red flags) following the long red flag during the 2011 Canadian Grand Prix. In-season testing allowed again at the circuit the FIA or teams (upon agreement) choose (Mugello Circuit in case of 2012). Backmarkers able to unlap themselves behind the Safety Car.

2014  New car formula of turbocharged V6 engines with 1600cc capacity and 8-speed gearbox introduced, which must now last at least  before being replaced and have the KERS (now known as ERS-K) integrated into it. New penalty points system introduced, teams must nominate eight gear ratios ahead of the first race, rear beam wings and false camera mountings banned, in-season testing returns, car nose further reprofiled. A new car number system where the driver is able to choose their own numbers for the duration of their career is also adopted. Double points awarded for the final race of the season.

2015  Further nose redesign, drivers restricted further to four engines per year, mid-season significant driver helmet design changes banned, double points no longer awarded for the final race, cars proceed to the pit lane instead of staying on the grid in event of a red flag.

2016  Drivers allowed to use five engines per year as number of races is 21. Drivers qualifying for FIA Super Licence must be at least eighteen years old and have scored 40 super licence points in recognised feeder series.

2017  Car width increased from 1800 mm to 2000 mm (reversing 1998 change). Front tyre width increased from 245 mm to 305 mm; rear tyre width increased from 325 mm to 405 mm. Teams restricted to four engines per year irrespective of number of races, engine token system abandoned, power unit suppliers now obliged to supply any team without any power unit contract. Shark fins are brought back and T-wings introduced through loophole. Barge board sizes also increased.

2018  Drivers were restricted to only three engines per year, despite the fact that the number of races was increased to 21. The shark fins and T-Wings have been banned again. After much debate and testing, the Halo cockpit protection device was mandatory from the 2018 season onwards.

2019  The front wing was simplified,  wider,  higher, and moved  further forward. The rear wing was made  wider and  higher, with a  larger DRS opening to improve DRS, reduce dirty air and promote more overtaking. Winglets were removed from brake ducts. Car's weight no longer includes driver's weight. Bonus point awarded to driver and constructor who sets race fastest lap for the first time since 1959, but the driver must finish in a points scoring position to receive the bonus point.

2020s

2020  Teams allowed one additional MGU-K replacement. Free practice sessions now count towards Super Licence points, requiring at least  without infractions to receive one, with a limit of ten Super Licence points across a three-season period from free practice sessions. The last  of the front wings must not contain any metals as a puncture prevention measure; from 2020 Italian Grand Prix drivers must use the same engine mode in both qualifying and race, thereby banning engine "party modes".

2021  A budget cap of $145 million was introduced. The dual-axis steering (DAS) system pioneered by Mercedes has been banned. Teams agreed to use 2020 cars in 2021 with development being done on token basis as a result of the COVID-19 pandemic disrupting car development. Cars are under parc fermé conditions following the end of free practice three instead of qualifying.

See also 
 Formula One
 Formula One regulations
 Formula One engines
 2009 Formula One season
 FIA
 List of Formula One fatal accidents
 1994 San Marino Grand Prix
 1978 Italian Grand Prix
 List of Formula One circuits
 Regenerative brake

References

Notes

Bibliography 

 Complete encyclopedia or formula one (2006). Parragon Books: 
 Vergeer, Koen (2003) Formula 1 fanatic. Bloomsbury Books: 
 Jones, Bruce (1994). The Ultimate Encyclopedia of Formula One. Carlton Books:
 Watkins, Sid (1996). Life at the Limit. Macmillan Books: 
 Watkins, Sid (2001). Life Beyond the Limit. Macmillan Books: 
 Williams-Renault (1994). Formula 1 Motor Racing Book. Dorling Kindersley Books: 
 Rubython, Tom (2006). The Life of Senna. Books Business F1: 
 Henry, Alan (2006). The Grand Prix Companion. Icon Books: 
 White, John (2007). The Formula One Miscellany. Carlton Books: 
 "FIA Archive". (2008). .
 "Inside F1". (2008). The Official Formula 1 Website
 "Technical Database in Focus" (2008)
 Autosport – 6 November 2008 edition

External links 
 Current regulations – from the FIA website

Formula One